The 1956 United States presidential election in Nevada took place on November 6, 1956, as part of the 1956 United States presidential election. State voters chose three representatives, or electors, to the Electoral College, who voted for president and vice president.

Nevada was won by incumbent President Dwight D. Eisenhower (R–Pennsylvania), running with Vice President Richard Nixon, with 57.97% of the popular vote, against Adlai Stevenson (D–Illinois), running with Senator Estes Kefauver, with 42.03% of the popular vote.

Results

Results by county

Notes

See also
United States presidential elections in Nevada

References

Nevada
1956
1956 Nevada elections